A statue of James A. Garfield by Charles Henry Niehaus stands in the United States Capitol's rotunda, in Washington, D.C., as part of the National Statuary Hall Collection. The marble statue was gifted by the U.S. state of Ohio in 1886.

See also
 1886 in art
 James A. Garfield Memorial
 James Garfield Memorial, Philadelphia
 James A. Garfield Monument
 Statue of James A. Garfield (Cincinnati), also by Niehaus
 List of sculptures of presidents of the United States

References

External links
 

1886 establishments in Washington, D.C.
1886 sculptures
Marble sculptures in Washington, D.C.
Monuments and memorials in Washington, D.C.
National Statuary Hall Collection
Sculptures of men in Washington, D.C.
U.S. Capitol